Kurt Vandendriessche (Roeselare, 24 February 1975) is a Belgian actor, theatre director and performer. He is working in theatre, film and television.

Television 
Vandendriessche made his debut on television in 1997 whilst finishing his actor's training at the Royal Conservatory of Brussels. 
He played the role of Fréderique Bastiaens in the national television drama series Thuis for two seasons. Some years later he played a regular part in the commercial television series Spoed, as the character of Tom Gijsbrecht.

During the past two decades he also featured in many guest roles mainly on Flemish television. Amongst others in Heterdaad, Recht op Recht, Flikken, Witse, Rupel, Zone Stad, Rang 1, Vermist, Aspe en Familie.

Film 
In 2007 he played Raymond in the movie Firmin, directed by Dominique Deruddere and based on the character of Chris Van Den Durpel.
In 2012 he accepted the male lead role in Welcome Home, a low budget film directed by Tom Heene. The movie was internationally acclaimed and was nominated for the Luigi de Laurentiis Award for Best Debut on the Venice Film Festival and for one of the three Zenith Awards on Montreal World Film Festival. One year later, it competed in les Magrittes du Cinéma, the Walloon Community movie awards, for Best Flemish Co-production.

From time to time Vandendriessche also acts in short films - amongst others Saint James Infirmary (2010), directed by Leni Huyghe who received the award for Best Debut on the International Short Film Festival of Leuven, and Nkosi Coiffure (2015) from filmmaker and actress Frederike Migom, which was selected in the short film competition of the Montreal World Film Festival. Together with his brother, film director Benny Vandendriessche, he shot the short film Front (2014), commissioned by the Museum aan de Yzer. A drama set in the trenches and a tribute to the soldiers who experienced shell shock during World War I.

Theater 
Throughout his career Vandendriessche focused mainly on theater performance. In 1999, he made his debut as the groom in Federico García Lorca’s Bloodwedding. That same year he played the role of a homeless teen in Wolves, a location-based creation inspired by the photograph book Raised by wolves by Jim Goldberg. After that he stood at the side of Flemish theatre icon Nand Buyl in the first Belgian creation of Martin McDonagh's The Beauty Queen of Leenane at the National Theatre in Antwerpen (Toneelhuis).
In 2000, he joined the puppet theatre company Figurentheater De Maan for two years and over that period acquired substantial experience in puppeteering.

Following that, Vandendriessche performed in Jan Decorte's play Cirque Danton (2002), which is where he met Charlotte Vanden Eynde. 
Together with her, he created the duet Map Me (2003) which received the prize of Best Dance Creation by the SACD. The piece toured for five years successfully throughout Europe and concluded with a mini tour in the US, passing through the Philadelphia Live Arts Festival, Portland's Time-Based Art Festival and Dance Theatre Workshop in New York.

Meanwhile, he attended a scenography course at the Ecole de Promotion Sociale Saint-Luc in Brussels and POPOK in Antwerp and in 2004 he created the light and stage design for Charlotte Vanden Eynde's Beginnings/Endings, which premiered on the Springdance Festival in Utrecht and the Kunstenfestivaldesarts in Brussels

From 2003 until 2007 he ran the theatre collective Scharlaken Dak together with theatre director and playwright Luc Frans. Their second production Mercurochroom (2004) received praise by the press and was mentioned in the newspaper De Morgen as one of the trend setting youth theatre productions of that year. In 2007 the company ceased to exist by lack of means of subvention.

In 2004 he collaborated for the first time with Jan Fabre, one of Belgium's leading visual artists and theatre directors, on the production Parrots & Guinea Pigs.  Some years later he joined the company again for a permanent replacement in Orgy of Tolerance (2010), as Prometheus in Prometheus: Landscape II (2011) and in the ensemble piece Tragedy of a Friendship (2012), an opera production on the works of Richard Wagner and his love-hate relationship with Friedrich Nietzsche, commissioned by the Flemish Opera.

For the Holland Festival in Amsterdam (2011–2013), he collaborated with Emio Greco on the dance production Addio alla Fine.

Personal work 
Throughout his career Vandendriessche also developed his own theatre productions, performances and installations as an independent artist.

In 2010, he created the show Pèrfides together with his five year old-daughter, in which he had himself directed by her. 
For Collapsus in 2011, a project in which he participated with Ragna Aurich, he guided two young brothers in the creation of a personal sci fi-story on brotherhood and rivalry.

That same year he wrote and directed the piece KooiVogelDroom for Figurentheater De Maan - the story of a confused young child who learns to conquer his fears by learning to take responsibility for himself and others. For this piece he adapted a procedure of mixed media techniques - set in a blue key studio, he directly captured and edited the manipulation of scale models and landscapes made out of modified picture prints resulting in a live animation film.

In 2012 he formed K&K together with his colleague Kasper Vandenberghe. A satirical duo and situationist questioning of the vulnerable position of the performance artist and his economic potential. In that year, they sporadically showed stand up-performances and had themselves advised and supported by experts from the advertising industry in a campaign towards their final product launch K&K - Bringin- Home the Bacon.

Filmography

Television roles

References

External links

1975 births
Living people
People from Roeselare
Belgian male actors
Belgian male stage actors
Belgian male film actors
Belgian male television actors
Flemish male actors
Flemish male stage actors
Flemish male film actors
Flemish male television actors
20th-century Belgian male actors
21st-century Belgian male actors